Websters is a theatre in Glasgow, Scotland. It also operates as a bar and restaurant. Websters occupies the building of the 19th-century former Lansdowne Parish Church.

Early years of the church
The building was founded as the Lansdowne United Presbyterian Church. It was built between 1862 and December 1863 in the Neo-Gothic style, on designs by John Honeyman. The total cost amounted to £12,400. A spire was built with a height of 66.5 metres (218 feet), which today is considered a Glasgow iconic landmark and one of the slimmest spires in Europe. In 1900, the church was renamed Lansdowne United Free Church, while in 1929, after the union with the Church of Scotland, it was renamed Lansdowne Parish Church.

Works of art
In 1865, three stained glass windows, designed by Ward and Hughes were installed in the apse, with others added in 1873. A number of stained glass windows were also added in 1913 by Alfred Webster, and in the 1950s by his son Gordon Webster. A war memorial frieze by Evelyn Beale was built in 1923. In 1911, the pipe organ, the work of Norman and Beard, was installed.

Closure and conversion
The church continued to function as a Parish church of the Church of Scotland till 2014, when the parish was united with Kelvin Stevenson parish, forming the Kelvinbridge Parish Church. The parish decided to use the Kelvin Stevenson Memorial Church as their church building, and the Lansdowne church building was sold.

Present use
In 2014, the church was sold and converted into a theatre, which also included a bar and restaurant in the former church halls. The building was renamed Websters in honour of Alfred Websters who designed some of the stained glass windows of the church. In 2017, the venue was briefly closed after masonry fell from the steeple. The current theatre can seat up to a 188 seats and holds numerous concerts and shows throughout the year. It also contains a Playhouse which seats 55 people.

References

1862 establishments in Scotland
19th-century Church of Scotland church buildings
Category A listed buildings in Glasgow
Former churches in Scotland
Listed theatres in Scotland
Music venues in Glasgow
Restaurants in Glasgow
Theatres in Glasgow